Jakobstad Church  (Swedish Jakobstads kyrka, Finnish Pietarsaaren kirkko) is a Lutheran church in the city of Jakobstad, Finland. It was constructed in 1731 by Johan Knubb. The church has been built on the same place, where the first church in Jakobstad was located before it was burned down by Russians in 1714.

The altarpiecewaspainted in 1784 målades by Frans Gabriel Westerberg from Stockholm.

The church is built of wood in the shape of a like sided cross. It is one of the first churches in Finland built like a cross. The brass chandeliers from the 1660s were saved from the Russians. The exceptional big menorah was donated in 1709 by the municipal counselor Niclas Wendelius. There is also an old Timpani from the 1840 century donated by the Commercial counselor Adolph Lindskog. The belltower of Ostrobothnian style was erected by Henrik Thomasson Kattil 1742. He was born in Jörala village in Vörå. There are two church bells from the 1690 century.

Congregations
There are two lutheran congregations in the city using the same church. The Swedish speaking Jakobstads svenska församling (Jakobstad's Swedish congregation) and the Finnish  speaking Pietarsaaren suomalainen seurakunta (Jakobstad's Finnish Congregation).

References

External links

Entry in the Finnish Historical building register

Wooden churches in Finland
Church
18th-century Lutheran churches
Buildings and structures in Ostrobothnia (region)
Churches completed in 1731
Lutheran churches in Finland